Social Alternative was a coalition of far-right political parties in Italy.

History 
The coalition grew from Social Action, which was founded by Benito Mussolini's granddaughter Alessandra Mussolini after she left the National Alliance due to their attempts to move away from the party's fascist past. The group was committed to a strong Italian nationalism that celebrated and glorified its past, and has been particularly critical of Gianfranco Fini's modernisation of the right.

Elections 
Mussolini united her group with the Social Action for the 2004 European Parliament election, gaining one seat in the European Parliament.

The Tricolour Flame joined the alliance for the 2005 regional elections, only to leave it some months later.

In the 2006 Italian general elections the coalition was a member of the defeated House of Freedoms and won no seats.

References 

2004 establishments in Italy
2006 disestablishments in Italy
Defunct nationalist parties in Italy
Defunct political party alliances in Italy
Neo-fascist organisations in Italy
Political parties disestablished in 2006
Political parties established in 2004